Katharina Knie is a 1928 play by the German writer Carl Zuckmayer. It was first performed on 20 December 1928 at the Lessing Theater in Berlin starring Elisabeth Lennartz and Albert Bassermann.

Adaptations
 In 1929 the film was turned into a silent film Katharina Knie directed by Karl Grune
 In 1957 it served as the basis for the musical Katharina Knie composed by Mischa Spoliansky with a libretto by Robert Gilbert
 It was also adapted for two television films released in 1964 and 1973.

References

Bibliography
 Wagener, Hans. Carl Zuckmayer Criticism: Tracing Endangered Fame. Camden House, 1995.

Plays by Carl Zuckmayer
1928 plays
German plays adapted into films